Yogendra Jha was an Indian politician belonging to the Praja Socialist Party. He was elected to the lower House of the Indian Parliament the Lok Sabha from Madhubani  in Bihar.

References

External links
Official biographical sketch in Parliament of India website

India MPs 1962–1967
Lok Sabha members from Bihar
Praja Socialist Party politicians
1931 births
Living people